Hawkins! Alive! At the Village Gate is a live album by saxophonist Coleman Hawkins which was recorded at the Village Gate in 1962 and released on the Verve label.

Reception

AllMusic stated "The great Hawkins (who debuted on records 40 years earlier) gets to stretch out on this live outing by his 1962 quartet ... Coleman Hawkins in his late 50s was still a powerful force.

Track listing
 "All the Things You Are" (Jerome Kern, Oscar Hammerstein II) – 8:16
 "Joshua Fit the Battle of Jericho" (Traditional) – 10:43
 "Mack the Knife" (Kurt Weill, Bertolt Brecht) – 8:50
 "It's the Talk of the Town" (Jerry Livingston, Al J. Neiburg, Marty Symes) – 9:28
 "Bean and the Boys" (Coleman Hawkins) – 7:02 Additional track on CD release
 "If I Had You" (Ted Shapiro, Irving King) – 8:35 Additional track on CD release

Personnel
Coleman Hawkins – tenor saxophone
Tommy Flanagan – piano
Major Holley – bass
Eddie Locke – drums

References

Coleman Hawkins live albums
1962 live albums
Verve Records live albums
Albums produced by Creed Taylor
Albums recorded at the Village Gate